George Molnar (25 April 1910, Nagyvárad – 16 November 1998, Sydney) was born in Nagyvárad, Austria-Hungary and came to Australia in 1939, where he practiced as a cartoonist and architecture lecturer. His work featured in the Sydney Morning Herald and Daily Telegraph newspapers for many years. 

Molnar studied architecture in Budapest, and worked as a government architect in Canberra. Later he taught architecture at UNSW and University of Sydney.

Articles

References

Bibliography
 Human scale in architecture: George Molnar's Sydney / Jo Holder, Robert Freestone and Joan Kerr (2003)
  – A discussion about Molnar with host Phillip Adams and guests Jo Holder and Joan Kerr for Australian Broadcasting Corporation radio
 Life in Canberra / by Alan Fitzgerald with illustrations by George Molnar (1975)

External links
 George Molnar collection – held and digitised by the National Library of Australia

1910 births
1998 deaths
People from Oradea
Australian editorial cartoonists
Australian people of Hungarian descent
Australian Jews
Hungarian emigrants to Australia
Officers of the Order of Australia